The 2nd Annual GMA Dove Awards were held in 1970. They recognized accomplishment of musicians for the year 1969.

Award winners
Song Of The Year
"The Night Before Easter"; Don Sumner, Dwayne Friend; Gospel Qt Music (SESAC)
Songwriter Of The Year
Bill Gaither
Male Vocalist Of The Year
James Blackwood
Female Vocalist Of The Year
Ann Downing
Male Group Of The Year
Oak Ridge Boys
Mixed Group Of The Year
The Speer Family
Most Promising New Gospel Talent
Four Gallileans
Album of the Year
Fill My Cup, Lord; The Blackwood Brothers; Darol Rice; RCA Victor
Instrumentalist
Dwayne Friend
Backliner Notes
Mrs. Jake Hess; Ain't That Beautiful Singin'''; Jake Hess
Cover Photo or Cover Art
Bill Grine; This Is My Valley; The Rambos
Graphic Layout And Design
Jerry Goff; Thrasher Brothers at Fantastic Caverns; The Thrasher Brothers
Television ProgramGospel Jubilee'', Florida Boys
D.J. of the Year
J. G. Whitfield

GMA Dove Awards
1970 music awards
1970 in American music
1970 in Tennessee
GMA